Bengt Robert Holmström (born 18 April 1949) is a Finnish economist who is currently Paul A. Samuelson Professor of Economics (Emeritus) at the Massachusetts Institute of Technology. Together with Oliver Hart, he received the Central Bank of Sweden Nobel Memorial Prize in Economic Sciences in 2016.

Early life and education
Holmström was born in Helsinki, Finland on 18 April 1949, and belongs to the Swedish speaking minority of Finland. He received his B.S. in mathematics and science from the University of Helsinki in 1972. He also received a Master of Science degree in Operations Research from Stanford University in 1975.

He received his Ph.D. from the Graduate School of Business at Stanford in 1978. He moved to the United States in 1976.

Career
He worked as a corporate planner from 1972 until 1974, then was an assistant professor at the Swedish School of Economics and Business Administration from 1978 until 1979. He served as an associate professor at the Kellogg Graduate School of Management at Northwestern University (1979–1983) and as the Edwin J. Beinecke Professor of Management at Yale University’s School of Management (1983–1994). Holmström was elected Alumnus of The Year by the University of Helsinki Alumni Association in 2010.

He has been on the faculty of M.I.T. since 1994, when he was appointed professor of economics and management at the department of economics and Sloan School of Management.

Holmström is particularly well known for his work on principal-agent theory. His work made seminal advances in understanding contracting in the presence of uncertainty. More generally, he has worked on the theory of contracting and incentives especially as applied to the theory of the firm, to corporate governance and to liquidity problems in financial crises. He praised the taxpayer-backed bailouts by the US government during the financial crisis of 2007–2008 and emphasizes the benefits of opacity in the money market.

Holmström was elected member of the Finnish Society of Sciences and Letters in 1992 and an honorary member of the same society in 2016. He is a fellow of the American Academy of Arts and Sciences, the Econometric Society, the European Economic Association and the American Finance Association, and a foreign member of the Royal Swedish Academy of Sciences and the Finnish Academy of Science and Letters. In 2011, he served as President of the Econometric Society. He holds honorary doctorate degrees from the Stockholm School of Economics, Sweden, the University of Vaasa and the Hanken School of Economics in Finland.

Holmström was a member of Nokia's board of directors from 1999 until 2012. He is a member of the Board of the Aalto University.

Accolades
He was awarded the 2012 Banque de France-TSE Senior Prize in Monetary Economics and Finance, the 2013 Stephen A. Ross Prize in Financial Economics and the 2013 Chicago Mercantile Exchange – MSRI Prize for Innovative Quantitative Applications.

In 2016, Holmström won the Sveriges Riksbank Prize in Economic Sciences in Memory of Alfred Nobel together with Oliver Hart "for their contributions to contract theory".

Personal life
He is married to Anneli Holmström with one son.

Publications
Holmström, Bengt, 1972. "En icke-linear lösningsmetod för allokationsproblem". University of Helsinki.
Holmström, Bengt, 1979. "Moral Hazard and Observability," Bell Journal of Economics, 10(1), pp. 74–91.
 Holmstrom, Bengt. "Moral hazard in teams." The Bell Journal of Economics (1982): 324–340.
 Holmstrom, Bengt. "Equilibrium long-term labor contracts." The Quarterly Journal of Economics (1983): 23–54. 23
 Holmström, B., 1999. Managerial incentive problems: A dynamic perspective. The Review of Economic Studies, 66(1), pp. 169–182.169–182
 Holmström, Bengt, and Paul Milgrom, 1991. "Multitask Principal-Agent Analyses: Incentive Contracts, Asset Ownership, and Job Design," Journal of Law, Economics, and Organization, 7, 24–52.
 Holmstrom, B. and Milgrom, P., 1994. The firm as an incentive system. The American Economic Review, pp. 972–991. 972–991.
 Holmström, Bengt, and John Roberts, 1998. "The Boundaries of the Firm Revisited," Journal of Economic Perspectives, 12(4), pp. 73–94
  Holmström, Bengt, and Jean Tirole, 1998. "Private and Public Supply of Liquidity," Journal of Political Economy, 106(1), pp. 1–40.

References

External links

  including the Prize Lecture 8 December 2016 Pay for Performance and Beyond

|-

1949 births
Living people
Finnish business theorists
20th-century Finnish economists
Finnish Nobel laureates
Game theorists
Information economists
Stanford Graduate School of Business alumni
Stanford University alumni
MIT Sloan School of Management faculty
Members of the Royal Swedish Academy of Sciences
Fellows of the American Academy of Arts and Sciences
Fellows of the Econometric Society
Presidents of the Econometric Society
Swedish-speaking Finns
Nokia people
Finnish expatriates in the United States
Nobel laureates in Economics
21st-century Finnish economists
MIT School of Humanities, Arts, and Social Sciences faculty
Nancy L. Schwartz Memorial Lecture speakers
Fellows of the European Economic Association